USNS Bowditch (T-AGS 62) is a . She is the third ship in the class. Bowditch is a part of a 29 ship Special Mission Ship program and operates in the South China Sea. She is named after mathematician Nathaniel Bowditch.

Incidents
On 24 March 2001, Bowditch encountered a PLA Navy frigate, which came within ,  while operating in the Yellow Sea near South Korea and was forced to leave. Bowditch later returned with an armed escort. 

On 24 September 2002, Bowditch was harassed by Chinese patrol boats and aircraft and forced to leave while operating in the Yellow Sea. In May 2003, Bowditch was bumped by a Chinese fishing vessel and suffered damage.

In 2013 Bowditch was engaged in surveying at Tacloban shortly after typhoon Haiyan in advance of the Navy's Operation Damayan in an area known for its shifting hazards to navigation using her multi-beam contour mapping system.

An American Littoral Battlespace Sensing (LBS) or similar underwater glider deployed by Bowditch was seized by a Dalang-III class submarine rescue vessel of the PLA Navy on 15 December 2016, resulting in a formal diplomatic protest.

References

External links

 USNS Bowditch official web site
Navy Special Missions Review

 

Pathfinder-class survey ships
Ships built in Pascagoula, Mississippi
1994 ships